South Bermondsey railway station is on the South London line, serving the district of South Bermondsey in the London Borough of Southwark and managed and operated by Southern. The station is the principal stop for Millwall F.C.'s The Den.

History

The original station was situated to the north-west of South Bermondsey Junction, on the northern side of Rotherhithe New Road. It opened on 13 August 1866 with the South London Line, and was originally named Rotherhithe; it was renamed South Bermondsey on 1 December 1869. It closed on 17 June 1928, when the present station, situated south of South Bermondsey Junction, took its place.

The 1928 station is on an embankment, and its platforms and buildings are of wooden construction; the current passenger access to the station from Rotherhithe New Road and Ilderton Road is by a footpath partly constructed on the embankment previously occupied by the line to Bricklayers Arms and Willow Walk Goods Depots. In 1993, football club Millwall opened their ground The Den adjacent to the station. A direct footpath was built from the station to the North Stand (away section) of the ground, this is used on match days only. Southern trains from London Bridge to  via  called at South Bermondsey until December 2012 when the new London Overground service started from Surrey Quays to Clapham Junction.

Accidents and incidents
On 21 January 1947, an empty stock train was involved in a rear-end collision with an electric multiple unit.

Services

All services at South Bermondsey are operated by Southern using  EMUs.

The typical off-peak service in trains per hour is:
 4 tph to 
 2 tph to East Croydon via 
 2 tph to  via 

From May 2022 there will be 2 additional services to London Bridge, departing at 08:10 and 08:40

Connections
London Buses routes 1, 381 and P12 serve the station.

The Quietway 1 cycle route passes the station entrance.

References

External links

Disused railway stations in the London Borough of Southwark
Former London, Brighton and South Coast Railway stations
Railway stations in Great Britain opened in 1866
Railway stations in Great Britain closed in 1917
Railway stations in Great Britain opened in 1919
Railway stations in Great Britain closed in 1928
Railway stations in the London Borough of Southwark
Former Southern Railway (UK) stations
Railway stations in Great Britain opened in 1928
Railway stations served by Govia Thameslink Railway
1866 establishments in England